Harriet Smith Windsor was the Delaware Secretary of State from 2001 through 2009. Windsor is a Democrat and currently services as the Vice Chair of the Delaware Democratic Party. In 2008 Windsor was an elector for Barack Obama.

Early life and education 
Windsor was born in Millsboro, Delaware. She earned a Bachelor of Arts from Juniata College before going on to obtain an M.A. and PhD from the University of Delaware.

Political experience
Windsor served as Delaware Secretary of State from 2001 to 2009.

Personal life
Windsor was married to Richard. She has two children named James and Julia. She lives in Lewes, Delaware. She is a member of the United Methodist Church.

References

Living people
Delaware Democrats
Secretaries of State of Delaware
Women in Delaware politics
2008 United States presidential electors
People from Lewes, Delaware
Juniata College alumni
21st-century American women politicians
21st-century American politicians
1940 births